Sydney Heritage Fleet, is the trading name of Sydney Maritime Museum Ltd., a public (non-profit) company in Sydney, New South Wales, Australia.

The Fleet restores and operates a number of historic vessels including the barque James Craig. In 2003 the World Ship Trust awarded James Craig its prestigious Maritime Heritage Award.

The offices, model workshop, some displayed boats, and the library are on Wharf 7 located in Darling Harbour. The James Craig is alongside the wharf. The fleet's shipyard is in Rozelle Bay;

History

The Lady Hopetoun and Port Jackson Marine Steam Museum was the forerunner of the Sydney Heritage Fleet. In 1965 a group of enthusiasts under Warwick Turner, formed the museum to preserve Sydney's 1902 VIP steam yacht Lady Hopetoun. The organisation later became known as the Sydney Maritime Museum Ltd. In 1998 the museum adopted the trading name Sydney Heritage Fleet, except for two years (2003/4) when 'Australian Heritage Fleet' (more accurately reflecting the fleets make up, for example the SS John Oxley has no connection to Sydney harbour) was used. The Fleet now comprises 10 historic vessels which is amongst the largest collections of its type in the world.

In 2019 the heritage fleet's reputation was marred by controversy following accusations of bullying and harassment  [8]

Organisation
The Sydney Heritage Fleet is supported by a membership of 1,200, with over 15 paid workers and 200 volunteer workers who restore, operate and maintain the fleet and preserve traditional maritime methods and skills. In addition to the 10 primary vessels being operated or restored, the Fleet also has 55 small heritage boats and a significant collection of marine engines under restoration, as well as a collection of over fifty model ships. A comprehensive research library and archive which includes photographs, ships' plans, diaries, logs and journals is also maintained.

Funding is through donations, membership subscriptions and income from vessel charters and tours.

Operational vessels

James Craig

James Craig is a three-masted, iron-hulled barque. Built in 1874 in Sunderland, England, by Bartram, Haswell, & Co., she was originally named Clan Macleod. She was employed carrying cargo around the world, and rounded Cape Horn 23 times in 26 years. In 1900 she was acquired by Mr J J Craig, renamed James Craig in 1905, and operated between New Zealand and Australia until 1911.

Waratah
Waratah is a coal fired tug and was launched at Cockatoo Island Dockyard, Sydney on 22 May 1902. Originally named Burunda, she was used to tow dredges and barges between the various ports along the NSW coast.

Lady Hopetoun
Lady Hopetoun is a 1902 VIP steam launch named after the Governor General of Australia's wife - the then Lady Hopetoun. She was built in the W. M. Ford yard at Berrys Bay, Sydney and launched on the tenth of April.

Boomerang 
The 1903 schooner Boomerang was launched as the Bona on 24 September; it was designed by the noted Sydney naval architect Walter Reeks

Protex a 1908 inner-harbour motor launch

Harman a 1947 ex  Royal Australian Navy harbour workboat/passenger motor boat

Berrima a 1954 Botany Bay workboat/passenger motor boat

Bronzewing, 1968 and Currawong, 1969, are Bronzewing-class harbour tugs (on loan from the Royal Australian Navy). They are used to berth and un-berth James Craig or to relocate the steam ships when not under steam.

Vessels under restoration

John Oxley

John Oxley is a steamship that previously served as a pilot boat and buoy tender. The ship was built in Scotland in 1927 for the Queensland state government.

Was relaunched in April 2022

Kanangra

Kanangara is a 1912 Sydney Ferries Limited steel and wooden ferry

Kookaburra II
A 1950s wooden speed boat

References

External links

Sydney Heritage Fleet

Maritime museums in Australia
Museums in Sydney
Maritime history of Australia